Nihonmatsu Lantern Festival(二本松提灯祭り Nihonmatsu-chochinmatsuri) is a Japanese traditional festival, located in Nihonmatsu, Fukushima, Japan.

History 
Nihonmatsu Lantern Festival is one of Japan's three Lantern festivals along with Akita Kanto, Akita and Owari Tshima Tenno, Aichi. Niwa Mitsushige instituted the festival in 1664.

See also 
 Lantern Festival, a Chinese festival celebrated on the fifteenth day of the Chinese New Year
 Nihonmatsu, Fukushima
 Nihonmatsu Castle
 Nihonmatsu Shonentai

References

External links 

 Nihonmatsu Lantern Festival (Japanese)
Nihonmatsu Lantern Festival (Japan travel guide)
Nihonamatsu Lantern Festival (rediscover Fukushima)

Traditions
Culture in Fukushima Prefecture
Nihonmatsu, Fukushima